Leader's Challenge was a Colorado, USA, based nonprofit organization that provided leadership training to high potential students through experiential education programs. Their mission was to create civic and service minded youth by developing leadership skills, inspiring purpose, and developing engagement in their communities. As of October 28, 2009, Leader's Challenge was shut down due to financial difficulties.

Leader's Challenge operated three programs, serving around 750 high school students annually.

History
Leader's Challenge was founded in 2000 by American author Tommy Spaulding, who serves as President/CEO of Up with People. The organization initially offered one program serving 60 eleventh grade students at 10 high schools in metro Denver and Boulder. 

In 2006, the organization expanded, with the introduction of a program aimed at high school seniors, and the absorption of the long-established Colorado Close Up program.

Programs

IGNITE
The flagship program, IGNITE is a year-long experience for high school juniors focusing on leadership development, service learning and civic engagement. Beginning with a four-day Summer Academy, students develop knowledge, skills and behaviors related to leadership and active citizenship, including self-confidence, team building, conflict management, critical thinking and problem solving skills. 

Throughout the year, teams of students at 35+ schools along Colorado's Front Range participate in monthly Challenges and service projects designed to involve them in their local communities while exploring topics such as community building, the role of media in society, leadership in the workplace, and state and local government.  

IGNITE culminates with each school team identifying a need in their community and partnering with an outside organization to implement a project that helps that need.

Global Challenge
Global Challenge is a yearlong experience for high school seniors designed to expand students’ worldview and explore leadership in a global context, beginning with a 3-day Summer Academy. 

Throughout their senior year, students participate in monthly seminars centered on issues related to global leadership, including intercultural communication, diplomacy, economics and development.  In addition, they examine topics such as indigenous cultures, historic and current conflict, the role of women, human rights, and policies concerning the environment, health, and service. 

The cornerstone of Global Challenge is an international trip over Spring Break, in which students live and work with citizens of either Costa Rica or Slovakia, and have the opportunity to experience their culture and customs firsthand while making a difference in the community.

Colorado Close Up
Colorado Close Up has been the state's largest civic education initiative since 1979, bringing students from across Colorado to the state Capitol for three days. 

While visiting Denver, students have the opportunity to observe the state legislature and courts, meet with elected officials from each branch of government, and work with lobbyists and business leaders to discuss how they can impact their communities.

Participants return home from Colorado Close Up with the knowledge and skills to identify problems and draw on local resources to create change in their communities.

Colorado Close Up was absorbed by Leader's Challenge in 2006.

Fees
Each Leader's Challenge program requires a fee which covers all costs associated with participation, including materials, staffing, facilities, accommodations, meals, and honorariums. 

The program fee for each program is as follows: 

 IGNITE: $875 
 Global Challenge: $475/$2000 (the program fee and trip fee respectively)
 Colorado Close Up: $250

Leader's Challenge is able to provide financial assistance to families in need for all three programs.

External links
Leadership Coaching

Leadership training
Youth organizations based in Colorado
Educational organizations based in the United States